Coptops intermissa is a species of beetle in the family Cerambycidae. It was described by Francis Polkinghorne Pascoe in 1883. It is known from Sulawesi.

References

intermissa
Beetles described in 1883